John Adda Lawrence is an American politician and businessman, and member of the Republican Party. In 2010, he was elected to represent the 13th District in the Pennsylvania House of Representatives. He serves on the Agriculture & Rural Affairs, Appropriations, Committee On Committees, Government Oversight, Professional Licensure, Rules, and Transportation Committees.

Early life 
Lawrence earned a bachelor's degree in business from Penn State University. He worked as an account officer for J.P. Morgan Chase.

Political career 
Lawrence was elected to the Pennsylvania House of Representatives in 2010. He authored Act 102 of 2018, which eliminated the possibility of domestic violence victims being required to financially support their convicted abuser. He's served on six committees in the House, including the House Professional Licensure Committee and the Appropriations Committee. In February 2019, Lawrence was named deputy whip.

Committee assignments 

 Agriculture & Rural Affairs, Vice Chair
 Appropriations, Secretary, Subcommittee on Government and Financial Oversight - Chair
 Committee On Committees
 Government Oversight
 Professional Licensure
 Rules
 Transportation, Secretary

Personal life 
Lawrence and his wife, Rebecca, have two daughters and live in West Grove, Pennsylvania.

References

External links
State Representative John Lawrence official caucus website
John Lawrence (R) official PA House website

1978 births
21st-century American politicians
Living people
Republican Party members of the Pennsylvania House of Representatives
Politicians from Chester County, Pennsylvania